Sarla Maheshwari ( Bhadani; born 21 July 1954) is an Indian politician. She was elected to the Rajya Sabha, the upper house of Indian Parliament from West Bengal as a member of the Communist Party of India (Marxist).

References

1954 births
Living people
Communist Party of India (Marxist) politicians from West Bengal
Rajya Sabha members from West Bengal
People from Bikaner
Women in West Bengal politics
Women members of the Rajya Sabha
20th-century Indian women politicians
20th-century Indian politicians
21st-century Indian women politicians
21st-century Indian politicians